Billy the Kid is a children's novel by the English author Michael Morpurgo, first published in 2000.

Plot summary 
Billy, an 80-year-old Chelsea Pensioner, looks back on his life. As a boy he loved football and was chosen to play for Chelsea Football Club. His youthful brilliance earned him the nickname of "Billy the Kid". Then his life was interrupted by the start of the Second World War and Billy joined the army. When he returned home, injured, he found that his home had been bombed and his whole family killed.

He became a vagrant but was later befriended by a family and encouraged their son Sam to play football. Sam grew up to play for Chelsea just like Billy did.

Publication information 
HarperCollins Children's Books,  reissued 2009. .

References 

2000 British novels
British children's novels
English novels
Novels set during World War II
British sports novels
Chelsea F.C.
Novels by Michael Morpurgo
Children's historical novels
2000 children's books
Novels about association football